Cass Township is a township in Shelby County, Iowa. There are 360 people and 146 households in Cass Township. The total area is 36.1 square miles.

References

Townships in Shelby County, Iowa
Townships in Iowa